is a Japanese fantasy novel series written by Nahoko Uehashi. Kadokawa published the original novel in two volumes in September 2014, and then republished it in four reprinted volumes between June and July 2017. A manga adaptation with art by Taro Sekiguchi was serialized online via Kadokawa Shoten's Young Ace Up website between July 2021 and March 2022. It was collected in two tankōbon volumes. An anime film adaptation by Production I.G premiered on February 4, 2022.

Plot
In the years following a vicious war, the Empire of Zol now controls the land and citizens of rival Aquafa-except for Aquafa's Fire Horse Territory, where wild dogs that once carried the deadly Black Wolf Fever continue to roam free. When a pack of dogs race through a Zol-controlled mine, Van, an enslaved former soldier, and a young girl named Yuna are both bitten, but manage to escape as the sole survivors of the attack. Finally free, Van and Yuna seek out a simple, peaceful existence in the countryside. But as the deadly disease once again runs rampant, they find themselves at the crossroads of a struggle much larger than any one nation.

Characters

Media

Novels

Manga

Anime film
An anime adaptation was announced on June 21, 2018.  It was later announced to be an anime film adaptation produced by Production I.G.  The film is directed by Masashi Ando and Masayuki Miyaji, with Ando designing the characters, Taku Kishimoto handling the scripts, and Harumi Fuuki composing the film's music. It was originally scheduled to premiere on September 18, 2020, but was delayed to September 10, 2021, due to undisclosed reasons. The film was delayed again in August 2021 due to the COVID-19 pandemic. It premiered on February 4, 2022.

The film had its world premiere in the official feature film competition at Annecy International Animation Film Festival on June 14, 2021. It has been licensed for release in the United Kingdom, Ireland, and French-speaking Europe by Anime Limited. Selecta Visión acquired the distribution rights for Spain, with a theatrical release date set for June 9, 2022. GKIDS acquired the film for release in North America and screened it in both Japanese with English subtitles and an English dub on July 13, 2022.

References

External links
  
  
  
 
 

2014 Japanese novels
2017 Japanese novels
2021 anime films
2021 manga
Anime films based on novels
Anime postponed due to the COVID-19 pandemic
Book series introduced in 2014
Fantasy anime and manga
Fantasy novel series
Japanese fantasy novels
Japanese webcomics
Kadokawa Dwango franchises
Kadokawa Shoten manga
Manga based on novels
Novels by Nahoko Uehashi
Production I.G
Seinen manga
Webcomics in print